Pietro Chiodini (27 July 1934 – 28 August 2010) was an Italian racing cyclist. He won stage 11 of the 1961 Giro d'Italia.

References

External links
 

1934 births
2010 deaths
Italian male cyclists
Italian Giro d'Italia stage winners
Place of birth missing
Cyclists from the Province of Pavia